Luke Russell is an Australian rules footballer who plays for the Penguin Football Club in the Tasmanian North West Football League (NWFL). Formerly a player in the Australian Football League (AFL), he was drafted by Gold Coast Football Club as an underage player from Burnie Dockers. He made his AFL debut against  in round 4 of the 2011 season.

Early life
Luke Russell was born in Burnie, Tasmania and grew up playing Basketball. He represented Tasmania at the state level in Basketball and would be chosen in the Australian u19 development squad in 2007. Due to many injuries he would give up playing Basketball in 2008 and focus on Australian rules football solely.

Junior football
Russell began his junior football with the Burnie Dockers who compete in the Tasmanian Football League and made his debut in the seniors team in 2008 as a 16-year-old. His form for Burnie in 2008 would earn him a spot in the Tasmanian team that competed in the Australian U16 Championships and was given an AIS scholarship later that year. At 17 years old he would be selected as the captain of the U18 Tasmanian team that competed in the 2009 AFL Under 18 Championships. Following his performance in the National Championships he was signed as an underage recruit by the Gold Coast Football Club to compete in the Victorian Football League in 2010. In November 2009 he relocated to the Gold Coast with Burnie teammate Maverick Weller to play for the Gold Coast in the VFL.

Senior career
He made his AFL debut against  at the Gabba in round 4 of the 2011 season. In his second game for the Gold Coast he would come on as a substitute and kick the winning goal in the club's first ever AFL victory. He was delisted at the conclusion of the 2016 season.

Russell joined VFL side, Northern Blues, in November 2016.

Russell, along with fellow former AFL player, Mav Weller, joined the Penguin Football Club as coach-players for the 2021 season.

Luke won The Penguin Football Club's Tommy Kaine Medal in 2021 for The Best and Fairest. He also took out The Advocate Newspaper's Player of the Year award. 

Russell will Coach the Penguin Football Club's Under 18 team in 2022.

Statistics

|- style="background-color: #EAEAEA"
! scope="row" style="text-align:center" | 2011
|
| 8 || 11 || 5 || 9 || 69 || 49 || 118 || 30 || 27 || 0.5 || 0.8 || 6.3 || 4.5 || 10.7 || 2.7 || 2.5
|-
! scope="row" style="text-align:center" | 2012
|
| 8 || 14 || 6 || 5 || 132 || 85 || 217 || 66 || 36 || 0.4 || 0.4 || 9.4 || 6.1 || 15.5 || 4.7 || 2.6
|- style="background:#eaeaea;"
! scope="row" style="text-align:center" | 2013
|
| 8 || 18 || 6 || 5 || 153 || 112 || 265 || 74 || 39 || 0.3 || 0.3 || 8.5 || 6.2 || 14.7 || 4.1 || 2.2
|-
! scope="row" style="text-align:center" | 2014
|
| 8 || 13 || 6 || 4 || 91 || 60 || 151 || 42 || 27 || 0.5 || 0.3 || 7.0 || 4.6 || 11.6 || 3.2 || 2.1
|- style="background:#eaeaea;"
! scope="row" style="text-align:center" | 2015
|
| 8 || 14 || 6 || 6 || 105 || 78 || 183 || 42 || 34 || 0.4 || 0.4 || 7.5 || 5.6 || 13.1 || 3.0 || 2.4
|-
! scope="row" style="text-align:center" | 2016
|
| 8 || 3 || 0 || 2 || 14 || 19 || 33 || 7 || 7 || 0.0 || 0.7 || 4.7 || 6.3 || 11.0 || 2.3 || 2.3
|- class="sortbottom"
! colspan=3| Career
! 73
! 29
! 31
! 564
! 403
! 967
! 261
! 170
! 0.4
! 0.4
! 7.7
! 5.5
! 13.2
! 3.6
! 2.3
|}

References

External links

1992 births
Australian rules footballers from Tasmania
Gold Coast Football Club players
Burnie Dockers Football Club players
Penguin Football Club players
Preston Football Club (VFA) players
Living people